The Museum of Flying is a private non-profit aerospace museum in Santa Monica, California. It was founded in 1974, closed in 2002, and reopened in 2012 in a new facility. The Museum exhibits the history of aviation, focusing on aviation history, with an emphasis on Donald Douglas and the Douglas Aircraft Company, in Southern California.

History
In 1974, Douglas Museum and Library was located on the South side of the Santa Monica Airport, the Museum migrated to the North side of the Airport and reopened as the Museum of Flying in April 1989. The Museum gradually grew to a collection of over 50 vintage aircraft, many of which were built in Southern California and are still in flight-ready condition.

The museum's collection of artifacts, exhibits, and aviation art chronicle the development of aviation in Southern California. The anchor aircraft for the Museum was the Douglas World Cruiser, "New Orleans" which made the first circumnavigation of the globe along with its sister ship, "Chicago", in 1924. The "Chicago" now resides at the Smithsonian Institution's National Air and Space Museum.

Over the next several years, the museum played host to many historic and memorable special events and activities, including "A Walk on the Moon" in 1999 in which seven NASA lunar astronauts were present .

One of the most popular programs was the children's A's Award Flight Program. On pre-selected dates, children achieving the letter grade "A" in any academic subject could receive a free airplane ride as a reward for dedication toward education. The museum also featured a number of other educational programs for both children and adults; including weekend family workshops and a volunteer presentation series.

The museum was forced to temporarily close in July 2002 due to economic problems. Since that time, museum officials executed a lease agreement with the City of Santa Monica for the leasehold at 3100 Airport Avenue. The expansion and remodeling project had an estimated cost of nearly $2 million. Construction at the new location was completed in 2012.

Exhibits and features

The museum provides displays and interpretive exhibits on the history of flight and the development and growth of the aviation and aerospace industry in Southern California and places heavy emphasis on the Douglas Aircraft Company and the history of the Santa Monica Airport.

The museum features approximately a dozen aircraft chronicling flight from its beginning with a replica Wright Flyer and Lockheed Vega both of which are featured in the film Night at the Museum: Battle of the Smithsonian. Both of these artifacts were donated by 20th Century-Fox studios. Static models of the North American F-86 Sabre and Douglas A-4 Skyhawk dominate the front of the Museum. A partially exterior nose section from a Boeing 727-200 donated by Federal Express that they operated in their fleet for twenty years is accessible to all and is a highlight of the museum. The Museum also features a broad collection of aviation art, rare artifacts, and ephemera from famous aviators, as well as an extensive collection of photographs of historic aircraft and aircraft manufacturing.

The Mezzanine features a recreation of the Douglas Aircraft Company Executive Board room, and a recreation of the office of Donald W. Douglas, Founder & Chairman of the Douglas Aircraft Company. The mezzanine also houses the new Museum Theater and Screening Room.

The museum also features a Max Flight FS 3000 simulator which offers 360 degrees of full range motion with surround sound and HD capabilities. This is the only simulator of its kind in the Los Angeles area.

References

Notes

Bibliography

 Ogden, Bob. Aviation Museums and Collections of North America. Sudbourne, UK: Air-Britain, 2007. .
 Parker, Dana T. Building Victory: Aircraft Manufacturing in the Los Angeles Area in World War II. Cypress, California: Dana T. Parker Books, 2013. .

External links
 Official website

Aerospace museums in California
Museum of Flying
Museums established in 1974
Buildings and structures in Santa Monica, California
Tourist attractions in Santa Monica, California
Museums in Los Angeles County, California
Organizations based in Santa Monica, California